Qalandar is a Pakistani television series first broadcast on Geo Entertainment from 14 October 2022. It is written by Samra Bukhari and produced by Abdullah Kadwani and Asad Qureshi under the banner of 7th Sky Entertainment, with Mikaal Zulfiqar as developer. The cast of the series includes Komal Meer, Muneeb Butt, Ali Abbas, Hiba Aziz, Asma Abbas and Kinza Razzak.

Cast 

 Komal Meer as Durr-e-Adan
 Muneeb Butt as Tabrez
 Ali Abbas as Irfan
 Kinza Razzak as Shafaq
 Hiba Aziz as Sumbul
 Asma Abbas as Safia
 Noor ul Hassan as Ayub
 Usman Chaudhry as Haneef 
 Naima Khan as Qudsia
 Kinza Malik as Rahat
 Ali Tahir as Ehsaan
 Sadoon Ali as Nomi
 Hamna Amir as Sheena
 Fajar Khan as ahmed abba
            as Tanveer
 kashif mehmood as safia's husband

Soundtrack 

The original soundtrack of the series is performed by Rahat Fateh Ali Khan, with music composition by Shani Arshad with the lyrics of Sabir Zafar.

Production 

On 4 October 2022, in a conversation with DAWN Images, Butt explained his and Meer's roles, and revealed that the story revolves around three to four characters and the essence of the story is faith of Allah.

References 

 2022 Pakistani television series debuts